Cylon may refer to:

Places
 Cylon, Wisconsin, a town in St. Croix County, US
 Cylon (community), Wisconsin, an unincorporated community in St Croix County, US

People
 Cylon of Athens, who attempted a coup in 632 BCE
 Cylon of Croton, who led a revolt against the Pythagoreans probably around 509 BC

Other uses
 Cylon (Battlestar Galactica), television series character

See also
 Zylon, synthetic fiber
 Ceylon, a former name for Sri Lanka